is a railway station on the Hachinohe Line in the town of Hirono, Kunohe District, Iwate Prefecture, Japan. It is operated by the East Japan Railway Company (JR East).

Lines
Rikuchū-Nakano Station is served by the Hachinohe Line, and is 48.4 kilometers from the terminus of the line at Hachinohe Station.

Station layout
Rikuchū-Nakano Station has a single ground-level side platform serving one bi-directional track. There is a small rain shelter built on top of the platform, but there is no station building. The station is unattended.

History
Rikuchū-Nakano Station opened on March 27, 1930. On the privatization of Japanese National Railways (JNR) on April 1, 1987, the station came under the operational control of JR East.

Surrounding area
Rikuchū-Nakano Post Office
National Route 45

See also
 List of railway stations in Japan

References

External links

 

Railway stations in Iwate Prefecture
Hirono, Iwate
Hachinohe Line
Railway stations in Japan opened in 1930
Stations of East Japan Railway Company